Lake Brook may refer to:

 Lake Brook (Otego Creek), in Otsego County, New York
 Lake Brook (West Branch Delaware River tributary), in Delaware County, New York